HHW may refer to:

 hhw (trigraph), used for the Dene Suline language
 Hahndorf Hill Winery, in South Australia
 Heating hot water, water used for heating
 Highland Hall Waldorf School, in Northridge, California, United States
 Hip Hop Weekly (magazine)
 Household hazardous waste
 Stan Stamper Municipal Airport, in Hugo, Oklahoma, USA
 Harmony Hall West, headquarters of the Barbershop Harmony Society